Turkey is a peninsular country.  At the north and south of the peninsulas the mountain ranges run  parallel to sea.  There are many short rivers flowing from the mountainous highlands to surrounding seas. Alluvial plains are situated at the mouth of the rivers . But most of the plains are small. Below is the list of some of the more important alluvial plains. The order in the table is counter clockwise from the north.

References and notes 

Alluvial plains